The 2015–16 La Salle Explorers women's basketball team will represent La Salle University during the 2015–16 college basketball season. The Explorers, led by sixth year head coach Jeff Williams. The Explorers are members of the Atlantic 10 Conference and play their home games at the Tom Gola Arena. They finished the season 5–25, 2–14 in A-10 play to finish in last place. They lost in the first round of the Atlantic 10 women's tournament to UMass.

2015–16 media

La Salle Explorers Sports Network
Select Explorers games will be broadcast online by the La Salle Portal. The A-10 Digital Network will carry all non-televised Explorers home games and most conference road games.

Roster

Schedule

|-
!colspan=9 style="background:#00386B; color:#FFC700;"| Non-conference regular season

|-
!colspan=9 style="background:#00386B; color:#FFC700;"| Atlantic 10 regular season

|-
!colspan=9 style="background:#00386B; color:#FFC700;"| Atlantic 10 Women's Tournament

Rankings
2015–16 NCAA Division I women's basketball rankings

See also
 2015–16 La Salle Explorers men's basketball team

References

La Salle
La Salle Explorers women's basketball seasons